Pour le Mérite is a 1938 propaganda film produced and directed by Karl Ritter for Nazi Germany. The film follows the story of officers of the Luftstreitkräfte (German Air Force) in the First World War who were later involved in the formation of the Luftwaffe. Pour le Mérite propagates the "stab legend", which consigns the German military defeat in World War I to an alleged treason in the homeland. At the same time, Ritter also glorifies the former fighter pilots as heroes of National Socialism.

Plot
In 1918, the German pilot Lieutenant Fabian (Albert Hehn), along with his fiancée Gerda (Carsta Löck) learn that he has been awarded the Order of Pour le Mérite ("The Blue Max"), Germany's highest award for valor. The next morning, Fabian and Jagdgeschwader 1 (the "Flying Circus" of Manfred von Richthofen) is ordered back to the front.

On the Western Front, Fabian and other officers of the squadron continue the aerial fight. Their commanding officer, Captain Prank (Paul Hartmann), returns from homeland with the news that a revolution has broken out in Germany. Prank and his men fly their aircraft back to Germany, but the squadron becomes involved in disputes with the local workers and soldiers. With the squadron's aircraft destroyed, the pilots and the crew surrender, and only Moebius (Fritz Kampers) seemingly disapproves.

The former officers successfully find postwar work in civilian occupations, but, Prank cannot cope. Moebius suddenly reappears and takes Prank and his wife, Isabel, to his estate, where Moebius has hidden his former warplane. He plans to start a flying school, but a communist group attacks, and his aircraft is destroyed. During the attack, Isabel is killed. Prank is arrested, and when Moebius fails in a rescue attempt, an embittered Prank serves out his sentence and then goes abroad.

After 1933, a wave of National Socialism flows in Germany with the Nazi regime attracting the discontented former officers of Jagdgeschwader 1, all of whom hold the coveted Pour le Mérite award. They have continued to keep in touch and developed a strong camaraderie. At one point, the men take to the streets to fight the communists and are arrested.

In 1935, Nazi Germany restores a new Luftwaffe and invites former officers to return. Fabian, Gerdes (Herbert A.E. Böhme) and Moebius, convince Prank to come back to Germany, where the latter gets appointed as the commanding officer of a new fighter squadron.

Reichsmarschall Hermann Göring, a former commander of Jagdgeschwader 1, visits the squadron as it equips with the new Messerschmitt Bf 109 fighter aircraft.

Cast
 Paul Hartmann as Captain Prank
 Herbert A.E. Böhme as Gerdes
 Albert Hehn as Lt. Fabian
 Paul Otto as Maj. Wissmann
 Fritz Kampers as Moebius
 Josef Dahmen as surcharge
 Willi Rose as frill
 Carsta Löck as Gerda Fabian
 Jutta Freybe as Isabel Prank
 Gisela von Collande as Anna Moebius
 Marina von Ditmar as Young Frenchwoman
 Otz Tollen as Capt. Reinwald
 Theo Shall as Capt. Cecil Wood
 Wolfgang Staudte as Lt. Ellermann
 Clemens Hasse as lancer
 Walter Bluhm as hussar
 Heinz Engelmann as cuirassier

Production
Pour le Mérite was produced and distributed by the UFA. The German premiere took place on 22 December 1938. The film was identified as "state political and artistic particularly valuable" as well as of "youth value".

After the end of the Second World War, the High Command of the Allied victorious powers prohibited the screening of  Pour le Mérite. Today, the evaluation rights are held by the Friedrich Wilhelm Murnau Foundation, which sanctions the screening of the film only in the context of special educational events.

Reception
Aviation film historian Bertil Skogsberg in Wings on the Screen: A Pictorial History of Air Movies (1987) characterized Pour le Mérite as "... notwithstanding its palpably Nazi undertones, can be regarded as a technically good film about flying." Further, he stated, "The film was permeated with patriotic fervor and, in spite of the glorification of the Nazi cause, it compelled the spectator's attention. Paul Hartmann was magnificent as the squadron leader, and he received much assistance from the other "flyers", Albert Hehn, Fritz Kampers and Herbert A.E. Böhme."

References

Notes

Citations

Bibliography

 Farmer, James H. Celluloid Wings: The Impact of Movies on Aviation. Blue Ridge Summit, Pennsylvania: Tab Books Inc., 1984. .
 Leiser, Erwin. Germany Awake!: Propaganda in Third Reich Films. Hamburg:  Rowohlt, Reinbek, 1976. . 
 Paris, Michael. From the Wright Brothers to Top Gun: Aviation, Nationalism, and Popular Cinema. Manchester, UK: Manchester University Press, 1995. .
 Pendo, Stephen. Aviation in the Cinema. Lanham, Maryland: Scarecrow Press, 1985. .
 Skogsberg, Bertil. Wings on the Screen: A Pictorial History of Air Movies. London: Tantivy Press, 1987. .

External links
 
 le Mérite film portal
 Pour le Mérite bei murnau-stiftung.de

1938 films
Films of Nazi Germany
Films shot in Germany
1930s action films
German action films
German drama films
German historical films
German political films
German war films
Films of the Weimar Republic
German black-and-white films
World War I aviation films
Films set in the 1920s
Nazi propaganda films
Films directed by Karl Ritter
1930s German-language films
1930s German films